Sarcochilus dilatatus, commonly known as the brown butterfly orchid, is a small epiphytic orchid endemic to eastern Australia. It has up to twelve, thin, leathery, dark green leaves and up to twelve brown or reddish brown flowers with a mostly white and yellow labellum.

Description
The tips of the sepals and petals are often dilated. The petals are a similar size to the dorsal sepal. The side lobes are erect with reddish brown lines and the middle lobe short and fleshy with a yellow tip. Flowering occurs between September and October.

Taxonomy and naming
Sarcochilus dilatatus was first formally described in 1859 by Ferdinand von Mueller who published the description in Fragmenta phytographiae Australiae from a specimen collected near Moreton Bay by Walter Hill.

Distribution and habitat
The brown butterfly orchid usually grows on trees, often hoop pine (Araucaria cunninghamii), in drier rainforest. It is found from Carnarvon Gorge and Gladstone in Queensland south to the Richmond River in New South Wales.

Conservation
Sarcochilus dilatatus is very rare in New South Wales with only a single recent record from that state and it is classed as "endangered" there. The main threats to the species are weed invasion and illegal collecting.

References

Endemic orchids of Australia
Orchids of New South Wales
Orchids of Queensland
Plants described in 1859
dilatatus
Taxa named by Ferdinand von Mueller